Edmund Buckley (24 December 1780 - 21 January 1867) was a British Conservative Party politician. He was a successful industrialist, owning iron works, collieries and cotton mills. He was the Chairman of the Manchester Exchange during the 1850s, resigning that post in 1860.

He was elected at the 1841 general election as a Member of Parliament (MP) for Newcastle-under-Lyme,
and held the seat until the 1847 general election, when he did not stand again.

His illegitimate son Edmund Peck, was born in 1834. Peck later adopted his father's surname and inherited his fortune, and became Sir Edmund Buckley, 1st Baronet.

References

External links 
 

1780 births
1867 deaths
Conservative Party (UK) MPs for English constituencies
English people of Irish descent
UK MPs 1841–1847
Members of the Parliament of the United Kingdom for Newcastle-under-Lyme
Dinas Mawddwy